A straight-three engine (also called an inline-triple or inline-three) is a three-cylinder piston engine where cylinders are arranged in a line along a common crankshaft.

Less common than straight-four engines, straight-three engines have nonetheless been used in various motorcycles, cars and agricultural machinery.

Design 

A crankshaft angle of 120 degrees is typically used by straight-three engines, since this results in an evenly spaced firing interval. Another benefit of this configuration is perfect primary balance and secondary balance, however an end-to-end rocking couple is induced because there is no symmetry in the piston velocities about the middle piston. A balance shaft is sometimes used to reduce the vibrations caused by the rocking couple.

Other crankshaft angles have been used occasionally. The 1976-1981 Laverda Jota motorcycle used a 180 degree crankshaft, where the outer pistons rise and fall together and inner cylinder is offset from them by 180 degrees. This results in three power strokes evenly-spaced at 180 degrees each, and then no power strokes during the final 180 degrees of crankshaft rotation. The 2020 Triumph Tiger 900 motorcycle uses a "T-Plane" crankshaft where the crankshaft throws are at 90 intervals, such that the throws for cylinders 1 and 3 are separated by 180 degrees (therefore the three throws together forming a "T" shape when viewed from the end).

Usage in cars 

Among the first cars to use a straight-three engine is the 1953-1955 DKW F91, powered by a  two-stroke engine. The 1956-1960 Saab 93 saw the introduction of Saab's  two-stroke engine, which was also used in the Saab 95, Saab 96 and Saab Sonett until 1968 after which it was replace by the Ford Taunus V4 engine.

The Wartburg cars (manufactured in East Germany) and FSO Syrena (manufactured in Poland) also used straight-three engines.

The 1967 Suzuki Fronte 360 uses a  two-stroke engine. In 1980, Suzuki began production of a  four-stroke engine, which was introduced in the Alto and Fronte models.

The Subaru EF engine is a 4-stroke petrol engine which was introduced in 1984 and used in the Justy and the Sumo (the export version of the Sambar).

The straight-three versions of the Ford EcoBoost engine - a turbocharged 1.0-litre petrol engine - was introduced in the 2012 Ford Focus. It uses an unbalanced flywheel to shift the inherent three-cylinder imbalance to the horizontal plane where it is more easily managed by engine mounts, and so remove the need to use balance shafts. In 2016, cylinder deactivation was added, claimed to be a world first for three-cylinder engines.

Usage in motorcycles 

The advantages of a straight-three engine for motorcycles are that it has a shorter length than an inline-four engine and produces less vibration than a straight-twin engine.

Four-stroke
Four-stroke straight-three engines have been used in road bikes and racing bikes by several companies. 

From 1985-1995, the BMW K75 was produced with a straight-three engine (based on the straight-four engine from the BMW K100). The British company Triumph has produced several models with transversely-mounted straight-three engines, such as the 1994-present Triumph Speed Triple and the 2004-present Triumph Rocket III.

In 2019, the Moto2 class in the MotoGP World Championship switched to using Triumph 765 cc (46.7 cu in) triple engines.

Two-stroke
Two-stroke designs are less common in straight-three engines than four-stroke designs, however several were produced by Japanese manufacturers in the late 1960s through to 1980s. 

The Kawasaki triple engine was produced from 1968 to 1980 and was used in various road bikes and racing bikes. Most versions were air-cooled, however several were water-cooled. Similarly, the 1972-1980 Suzuki GT series engines were used for both road bike and racing bikes, and were available in both air-cooled and water-cooled versions.

Other uses

Agriculture 

An example of an agricultural application is the Fairbanks-Morse 32E14 low-speed diesel engine.

The straight-three layout is common for diesel tractor engines, such as the Perkins AD3.152. This engine was used in the Massey Ferguson 35 and Fordson Dextra tractors, as well as for marine and stationary applications.

Aviation 
The Hewland AE75  is a 750 cc two-stroke aircraft engine that was produced in the mid-1980s. It was an inverted three-cylinder design with liquid-cooling that produced .

See also 

 Straight engine
 V3 engine

References

3